Hurricane Nicole was a sprawling late-season Category 1 hurricane in November 2022. The fourteenth named storm and eighth hurricane of the 2022 Atlantic hurricane season, Nicole formed as a subtropical cyclone on November 7, from a non-tropical area of low pressure near the Greater Antilles, and transitioned into a tropical cyclone the next day. Then, taking a path similar to that of Hurricane Dorian three years earlier, Nicole made landfall on November 9, on Great Abaco and on Grand Bahama in The Bahamas, where it strengthened into a Category 1 hurricane. On November 10, it made landfall twice in Florida, south of Vero Beach and then northwest of Cedar Key, after briefly emerging over the Gulf of Mexico. Nicole then weakened to a depression while moving over the Florida Panhandle, and then was absorbed into a mid-latitude trough and cold front over extreme eastern Tennessee the following day.

Nicole became the third November hurricane on record to make landfall in Florida, along with the 1935 Yankee hurricane and Hurricane Kate in 1985. Nicole crossed the same region in Florida devastated six weeks earlier by Hurricane Ian, and was the first hurricane to make landfall on Florida's east coast since Katrina in 2005. Despite being relatively weak, Nicole's large size produced widespread heavy rainfall and strong winds across the Greater Antilles, the Bahamas, and Florida, knocking out power and inflicting significant damage in many areas. Days of strong on-shore wind flow onto the east coast of Florida produced severe beach erosion, especially in Volusia, St. Johns, and Flagler counties. Eleven indirect deaths altogether have been connected to the storm, six in the Dominican Republic and five in Florida.

Meteorological history 

On November 4, the National Hurricane Center (NHC) began monitoring the northeastern Caribbean Sea and southwestern Atlantic Ocean where a large non-tropical low-pressure system was expected to develop within a few days. On November 5, an area of low pressure producing disorganized showers and thunderstorms developed just north of Puerto Rico. Benefitting from the inflow of moist tropical air from the Caribbean Sea and very warm  sea surface temperatures, the disturbance was soon exhibiting some subtropical characteristics, and gradually becoming better organized. This trend continued into the next day, with a sufficiently well-defined center of circulation developing, deep convection increasing and a band of winds with speeds reaching  occurring to the east of the center. The following morning, inner-core convection within the system improved and the radius of its maximum winds contracted, indicating that Nicole had transitioned into a tropical cyclone. At 08:00 UTC the following morning, Nicole made landfall on North Hutchinson Island, just south of Vero Beach, Florida, with the same strength. Nicole then weakened to a tropical storm inland, as it moved across the state, though it remained well organized, with tropical storm-force winds extending out  to the northeast of its center. As a result, heavy rains fell across central and northern Florida and southeast Georgia. Later that day, its center briefly emerged over the Gulf of Mexico, north of Tampa, before moving onshore again northwest of Cedar Key, in Florida's Big Bend region. Inland, the storm weakened to a depression, as it moved into southwest Georgia. Early on November 11, Nicole traversed western Georgia between an Atlantic high and a mid-latitude trough and cold front approaching from the west. Later that day, after moving over extreme western North Carolina into eastern Tennessee, it was absorbed into the mid-latitude system.

Preparations

Bahamas 
Upon the development of Nicole the Government of the Bahamas issued a tropical storm watch at 09:00 UTC on November 7, for the northwestern Bahamas. This was changed to a hurricane watch three hours later. Then, at 21:00 UTC, a hurricane warning was issued for the northwestern Bahamas, including the Abacos, Berry Islands, Bimini, and Grand Bahama Island. A tropical storm warning was also issued for Andros Island, New Providence, and Eleuthera. As of 09:00 UTC on November 10, all warnings had been discontinued for the northwestern Bahamas.

Temporary shelters were opened at multiple locations on Grand Bahama and the Abaco Islands. Several hundred people took refuge in them as the storm approached.

United States 
Amtrak cancelled or modified its Auto Train, Silver Meteor, and Silver Star services between November 8 and 11.

Florida 
Florida governor Ron DeSantis declared a state of emergency on November 7, covering 34 counties, including Miami-Dade, Broward, and Palm Beach. President Joe Biden declared an emergency in Florida on November 9, and ordered that federal assistance be provided to state, tribal and local governments to alleviate the impacts of the approaching storm. Tropical storm and hurricane watches, as well as warnings were in effect for the southern portion of Florida, as well as storm surge watches.

Multiple schools were closed throughout several counties, Several Central Florida theme parks, such as SeaWorld Orlando and Busch Gardens Tampa Bay announced that they would be closed on November 10, due to the storm; Universal Orlando and Walt Disney World both expressed the hope to be able to open at some point during the day. The November 10 start date of the Pelican Women's Championship golf tournament at Belleair (west of Tampa), was postponed due to the storm's approach, and the event shortened to 54 holes. A Veterans Day parade was cancelled in Jacksonville, as was a ceremony in Hillsborough County. Officials at the Kennedy Space Center delayed the launch of NASA's Artemis 1 by two days, until November 16. The rocket remained on the launchpad during the storm.

The region's major airports: Palm Beach, Daytona Beach and Orlando, suspended operations while Nicole passed through. Additionally, local officials issued mandatory evacuation orders for residents of barrier islands, low-lying areas and mobile homes.

Neighboring states 
Storm surge and tropical storm watches were issued for coastal South Georgia. Also, numerous school systems in South Georgia closed their schools. Tropical storm warnings as well as watches were issued for the coast of South Carolina. Coastal flooding warnings were issued in advance. Severe weather advisories and flash flood warnings were issued for several counties in North Carolina. Also, Hersheypark in South Central Pennsylvania closed on November 11 in preparation of the storm.

Impact

Lesser Antilles 
Nicole's precursor disturbance brought heavy rains to several islands of the Lesser Antilles, causing floods and landslides. Impacted were Dominica, Saint Lucia, and Guadeloupe, still recovering from the passage of Hurricane Fiona in mid-September. Antigua and Barbuda, Saint Kitts and Nevis, and the British Virgin Islands also observed heavy rain. No major storm damage or loss of life was reported.

Greater Antilles 
Torrential rains of  fell on Puerto Rico on  Similar rain totals were reported in the Dominican Republic. Additionally, several hundred homes were damaged and the country's agricultural sector was adversely impacted.

Bahamas 
Flooding and storm surge inundated Grand Bahama, Great Abaco, and New Providence, among other islands. Also, downed trees and power outages were reported across the northwestern Bahamas. Surge-related waves flooded some parts of Nassau, on New Providence. There were no reports of serious injuries or deaths as a result of the storm in the Bahamas.

United States

Florida 
Nicole brought major storm surge flooding to Florida's east coast. Nearly 50 coastal condominiums, single-family homes and hotels in Volusia County, previously damaged by Hurricane Ian six weeks earlier, collapsed or were put at danger of collapsing due to severe beach erosion caused by the two storms. Additionally, in St. Johns County, the surging ocean damaged a  section of State Road A1A and swamped parts of St. Augustine. Significant damage to the A1A also occurred in neighboring Flagler County. An initial cost estimate of property damage in Volusia and Flagler counties combined exceeds $500 million. Storm surge of 1 to  also occurred on the western coast of the Florida, causing minor impacts.

There were five indirect deaths in Florida as a result of Nicole. Two people were killed after being electrocuted by downed power lines in Conway. Two people were killed in a crash on Florida's Turnpike. Another person was found dead in Cocoa on a yacht.

The highest wind gust, was recorded atop Launch Complex 39B at the Kennedy Space Center, where Artemis 1 was on the pad. The rocket suffered minor damage, but was cleared for launch by NASA following repairs, and was successfully launched on November 16.

Human remains at what is believed to be a Native American burial site on South Hutchinson Island were unearthed by storm erosion, near the point of landfall. Previously, hurricanes Dorian, in 2019, and Sandy, in 2012, unearthed centuries old bones of Native Americans in that same general area.

Much of Florida experienced heavy rains, gusty winds, and power outages as Nicole moved across the state. More than 300,000 homes and businesses lost power statewide.

Other states 
Nicole brought heavy rainfall and gusting winds to much of the southeastern U.S.. In South Georgia, 2,700 customers lost power. Storm surge driven flooding was reported as far north as Charleston, South Carolina.

Portions of North Carolina and Virginia were under a tornado watch on November 11; two short-lived EF0 tornadoes were confirmed near Tignor and Dinwiddie, Virginia with damage limited to trees, outbuildings, and farm equipment. A soaking rain fell upon the North Carolina mountains: the highest total was  near Mount Mitchell State Park.

See also 

 Weather of 2022
 Tropical cyclones in 2022
 Timeline of the 2022 Atlantic hurricane season
 List of Florida hurricanes (2000–present)
 List of costliest Atlantic hurricanes
 1949 Florida hurricane – Category 4 hurricane that had a similar track
 Hurricane Gordon (1994) – made landfall on the western coast of Florida in November as a tropical storm
 Hurricane Erin (1995) – Category 2 hurricane that had a similar track
 Hurricane Jeanne (2004) – Category 3 hurricane that had a similar track
 Hurricane Eta (2020) – made landfall on the western coast of Florida in November as a tropical storm

References

External links 
 National Hurricane Center's advisory archive on Hurricane Nicole
 NWS Weather Prediction Center's Storm Summary archive for Heavy Rainfall and High Winds Associated with Nicole

2022 Atlantic hurricane season
Category 1 Atlantic hurricanes
Hurricanes in Florida
N
N
N
N